The 1997 U.S. Men's Clay Court Championships was an Association of Tennis Professionals men's tennis tournament held in Orlando, Florida in the United States that was part of the World Series of the 1997 ATP Tour. It was the 29th edition of the tournament and was held from April 21 to April 28. First-seeded Michael Chang won the singles title.

Finals

Singles

 Michael Chang defeated  Grant Stafford 4–6, 6–2, 6–1
 It was Chang's 4th title of the year and the 30th of his career.

Doubles

 Mark Merklein /  Vincent Spadea defeated  Alex O'Brien /  Jeff Salzenstein 6–4, 4–6, 6–4
 It was Merklein's only title of the year and the 1st of his career. It was Spadea's 1st title of the year and the 2nd of his career.

References

External links 
Association of Tennis Professionals (ATP) – tournament profile